Guzmania circinnata is a plant species in the genus Guzmania. This species is native to Costa Rica, Panama and Colombia.

References

circinnata
Flora of Costa Rica
Flora of Panama
Flora of Colombia
Plants described in 1987